Thiorphan is the active metabolite of the antidiarrheal racecadotril (acetorphan). It prevents the degradation of endogenous enkephalins by acting as an enkephalinase inhibitor.

References 

Enkephalinase inhibitors
Antidiarrhoeals
Amino acid derivatives
Thiols
Carboxamides
Propionamides